Since the 1968 Summer Olympics did not feature tennis as an official sport, two unofficial tournaments were held during the Games: a Demonstration tournament and an Exhibition tournament.

The Demonstration tournament was played from 14 to 20 October 1968 at three venues in Guadalajara, Mexico: Guadalajara Country Club, Atlas Sports Club and Guadalajara Sports Club; all of them featured clay courts. All matches were played at best-of-five sets; since the tiebreak rule was not implemented until the 1970s, a player had to win a set by a two-game margin in case of a 6–6 draw.

Spaniard Manuel Santana won the tournament by defeating his compatriot Manuel Orantes 2–6, 6–3, 3–6, 6–3, 6–4 in the final. American Herb Fitzgibbon won the third place.

Seeds

Draw

Finals

Top half

Bottom half

References

External links
 Official Results Archive (ITF)

Demonstration
Men's events at the 1968 Summer Olympics